The 3rd Annual Latin Grammy Awards were held in Los Angeles at the Kodak Theatre on Wednesday, September 18, 2002. Alejandro Sanz was the night's big winner, winning a total of three awards including Album of the Year. The ceremony returned in style after the 2001 ceremony was cancelled because of the September 11, 2001 terrorist attacks across America, and all presenters apologized to viewers during the broadcast for such.

Awards
Winners are in bold text.

General
Record of the Year
Alejandro Sanz — "Y Sólo Se Me Ocurre Amarte"
Celia Cruz — "La Negra Tiene Tumbao"
La Ley — "Mentira"
Gian Marco — "Se Me Olvidó"
Carlos Vives — "Déjame Entrar"

Album of the Year
Alejandro Sanz — MTV Unplugged
Miguel Bosé — Sereno
Celia Cruz — La Negra Tiene Tumbao
Ivan Lins — Jobiniando
Carlos Vives — Déjame Entrar

Song of the Year
Alejandro Sanz — "Y Sólo Se Me Ocurre Amarte"
Juanes — "A Dios le Pido"
Andres Castro, Martín Madera and Carlos Vives — "Déjame Entrar" (Carlos Vives)
Sergio George and Fernando Osorio — "La Negra Tiene Tumbao" (Celia Cruz)
Miguel Bosé, Lanfranco Ferrario and Massimo Grilli — "Morenamia" (Miguel Bosé)

Best New Artist
Jorge Moreno
Cabas
Circo
Gian Marco
Sin Bandera

Pop
Best Female Pop Vocal Album
Rosario — Muchas Flores
Ana Belén — Peces de Ciudad
Cecilia Echenique — Secreta Intimidad
Mónica Molina — Vuela
Nicole — Viaje infinito

Best Male Pop Vocal Album
Miguel Bosé — Sereno
Jorge Drexler — Sea
Alejandro Lerner — Lerner Vivo
Gian Marco — A Tiempo
Marco Antonio Solís — Más de Mi Alma

Best Pop Album by a Duo/Group with Vocals
Sin Bandera — Sin Bandera
Amaral — Estrella de mar
Mamma Soul — Fe
Presuntos Implicados — Gente
Supernova — Retráctate

Best Pop Instrumental Album
Chucho Valdés — Canciones Inéditas
Gustavo Cerati — +Bien
Rey Guerra — De Sindo A Silvio
José Padilla — Navigator
Roberto Perera — Sensual

Rap/Hip-Hop
Best Rap/Hip-Hop Album
Vico C — Vivo
Camorra — Vírus
Nilo MC — Guajiro Del Asfalto
Nocaute — CD Pirata
X-Alfonso — X - Moré

Rock
Best Rock Solo Vocal Album
Alejandra Guzmán — Soy
Celeste Carballo — Celeste Acústica
León Gieco — Bandidos Rurales
Miguel Ríos — Miguel Ríos y las estrellas del rock latino
Luis Alberto Spinetta — Silver Sorgo

Best Rock Album by a Duo/Group with Vocals
La Ley — MTV Unplugged
Babasónicos — Jessico
Circo — No Todo Lo Que Es Pop Es Bueno
Elefante — El Que Busca Encuentra
Kinky — Kinky

Best Rock Song
Juanes — "A Dios le Pido"
Reyli Barba and Rafael López — "Así Es La Vida" (Elefante)
Luis Alberto Spinetta — "El Enemigo"
León Gieco and Luis Gurevich — "Idolo De Los Quemados" (León Gieco)
Beto Cuevas — "Mentira" (La Ley)

Tropical
Best Salsa Album
Celia Cruz — La Negra Tiene Tumbao
Marc Anthony — Libre
El Gran Combo de Puerto Rico — Nuevo Milenio~El Mismo Sabor
Giro — Mi Nostalgia
Tito Rojas — Quiero Llegar A Casa

Best Merengue Album
Olga Tañón — Yo Por Ti
Eddy Herrera — Atrevido
Los Toros Band — Pa' La Calle
Kinito Méndez — A Palo Limpio
Fernando Villalona — Mal Acostumbrado

Best Contemporary Tropical Album
Carlos Vives — Déjame Entrar
Felix D'Oleo — Frutos
Celso Piña — Barrio Bravo
Síntesis — Habana A Flor De Piel
Vocal Sampling — Cambio De Tiempo

Best Traditional Tropical Album
Bebo Valdés Trio with Israel López "Cachao" and Carlos "Patato" Valdés — El Arte del Sabor
Nelson González — Pa' Los Treseros
Totó la Momposina — Pacantó
Various Artists — Cuban Masters - Los Originales
Charlie Zaa — De Un Solo Sentimiento

Best Tropical Song
Andrés Castro, Martín Madera and Carlos Vives — "Déjame Entrar" (Carlos Vives)
Gustavo Arenas and Jorge Luis Piloto — "Como Olvidar" (Olga Tañón)
Jandy Feliz — "La Pasión"
Julio Castro — "Me Liberé" (El Gran Combo de Puerto Rico)
Omar Alfanno — "Pueden Decir" (Gilberto Santa Rosa)

Regional Mexican
Best Ranchero Album
Vicente Fernández — Más Con El Número Uno
Pepe Aguilar — Lo Mejor De Nosotros
Ana Bárbara — Te Regalo La Lluvia
Aida Cuevas — Enhorabuena
Alejandro Fernández — Orígenes

Best Banda Album
Cuisillos de Arturo Macias — Puras Rancheras Con Cuisillos
Banda Machos — A Prueba De Balas
Banda Pachuco — Quedate Conmigo
Jenni Rivera — Se las Voy a Dar a Otro
Thalía — Thalía con banda: Grandes éxitos

Best Grupero Album
Joan Sebastian — Lo Dijo El Corazon
Grupo Bryndis — En El Idioma Del Amor
Guardianes Del Amor — Muriendo De Frio
Los Mismos — Perdón Por Extrañarte
Priscila & Sus Balas De Plata — Para Mi Amor

Best Tejano Album
Jimmy González & El Grupo Mazz — Siempre Humilde
David Lee Garza & Los Musicales — Estamos Unidos
Ram Herrera — Ingrata
La Mafia — Inconfundible
Los Desperadoz — Desde El Corazón

Best Norteño Album
Ramón Ayala y Sus Bravos del Norte — El Número Cien
Atrapado — Muevete Muevete Mas
Intocable — Sueños
Los Huracanes del Norte — Mensaje De Oro
Los Palominos — Un Poco Más

Best Regional Mexican Song
Freddie Martínez — "Del Otro Lado Del Porton" (Ramón Ayala y Sus Bravos del Norte)
Jimmy González — "Ahora Que Hago Sin Ti" (Jimmy González & El Grupo Mazz)
Joan Sebastian — "Apuesto" (Pepe Aguilar)
Joan Sebastian — "Manantial De Llanto"
Sylvia Ivañez and Bebu Silvetti — "Siempre Te Amaré" (Aida Cuevas)

Traditional
Best Folk Album
Susana Baca — Lamento Negro
Berrogüetto — Hepta
Kepa Junkera — Maren
Petrona Martínez — Bonito Que Canta
Lázaro Ros — Orisha Ayé. Shangó

Best Tango Album
Sérgio & Odair Assad — Sérgio & Odair Assad Play Piazzolla
Adrián Iaies — Tango Reflections
Raul Jaurena — Tango Bar
Néstor Marconi — Sobre Imágenes
Julia Zenko — Tango Por Vos

Best Flamenco Album
Antonio Núñez — Mis 70 Años Con El Cante
Remedios Amaya — Sonsonete
Arcángel — Arcángel
Diego El Cigala — Corren Tiempos De Alegría
Martirio — Mucho Corazón

Jazz
Best Latin Jazz Album
Gonzalo Rubalcaba Trio — Supernova
Richie Beirach, Gregor Huebner and George Mraz — Round About Federico Mompou
William Cepeda — Expandiendo Raices/Branching Out
Charlie Haden — Nocturne
Omar Sosa — Sentir

Christian
Best Christian Album
Padre Marcelo Rossi — Paz - Ao Vivo
Ileana Garcés — El Amor Tiene Un Valor
Roberto Orellana — Mi Nuevo Amor
Rabito — Viva La Vida
33 DC — Ven, Es Tiempo de Adorarle

Brazilian
Best Brazilian Contemporary Pop Album
Lenine — Falange Canibal
Bossacucanova and Roberto Menescal — Brasilidade
Zélia Duncan — Sortimento
Otto — Condom Black
Ivete Sangalo — Festa

Best Brazilian Rock Album
Cássia Eller — Acústico MTV
Arnaldo Antunes — Paradeiro
CPM 22 — CPM 22
Roberto Frejat — Amor Pra Recomeçar
Los Hermanos — Bloco do Eu Sozinho

Best Samba/Pagode Album
Zeca Pagodinho — Deixa a Vida Me Levar
Martinho da Vila — Da Roca e da Cidade
Claudio Jorge — Coisa de Chefe
Riachão — Humanenochum
Nelson Sargento — Flores em Vida

Best MPB Album
Chico Buarque and Edu Lobo — Cambaio
Dori Caymmi — Influencias
Celso Fonseca and Ronaldo Bastos — Juventude/Slow Motion Bossa Nova
Guinga — Cine Baronesa
Ed Motta — Dwitza

Best Sertaneja Music Album
Bruno & Marrone — Acústico – Ao Vivo
Zezé di Camargo & Luciano — Zezé di Camargo e Luciano
Marlon & Maicon — Marlon e Maicon
Rio Negro and Solimões — So Alegria
Trio Parada Dura — Brilhante

Best Brazilian Roots/Regional Album
Gilberto Gil — São João Vivo
As Galvão — Nois e a Viola
Caju & Castanha — Andando de Coletivo
Heraldo do Monte — Viola Nordestina
Dominguinhos — Lembrando Voce

Best Brazilian Song
Dori Caymmi and Paulo César Pinheiro — "Saudade de Amar" (Nana Caymmi)
Celso Fonseca and Ronaldo Bastos — "A Voz do Coração"
Arnaldo Antunes and Pepeu Gomes — "Alma" (Zélia Duncan)
Eri do Cais and Serginho Meriti — "Deixa a Vida Me Levar" (Zeca Pagodinho)
Riachão — "Va Morar com o Diabo" (Cássia Eller)

Children's
Best Latin Children's Album
Xuxa — Só Para Baixinhos 2
Belinda — Cómplices al Rescate
Chiquititas — Chiquititas Vol. 7
Melody — De Pata Negra
Miliki — Navidades Animadas

Classical
Best Classical Album
Quarteto Amazonia — Adiós Nonino - Quarteto Amazônia Toca Astor Piazzolla
Pablo Roberto Diemecke and Jorge Federico Osorio — Chávez: Conciertos Para Violin y Piano
María Guinand — Golijov: La Pasión Según San Marcos
Luiz De Moura Castro and María José Montiel — Modinha - Brazilian Songs
Cuarteto Latinoamericano — Villa-Lobos: String Quartets, Vol. 6

Production
Best Engineered Album
Andrés Bermúdez, Joel Numa and Silvio Richetto — Alexandre Pires (Alexandre Pires)
Jon Fausty — Cambio De Tiempo (Vocal Sampling)
Jorge "Mosquito" Garrido, Facundo Rodríguez, Ricardo Troilo and Alvaro Villagra — Lerner Vivo (Alejandro Lerner)
Moogie Canazio — Sandy & Junior (Sandy & Junior)
Gerónimo Labrada, Jr. and X-Alfonso — X-Moré (X-Alfonso)

Producer of the Year
Kike Santander
Humberto Gatica
Sebastian Krys
Gerónimo Labrada, Jr. and X-Alfonso
Ana Lourdes Martínez Nodarse

Music Video
Best Music Video
Shakira — "Suerte"
Celia Cruz — "La Negra Tiene Tumbao"
Juanes — "A Dios le Pido"
Paulina Rubio — "Yo No Soy Esa Mujer"
Carlos Vives — "Déjame Entrar"

References 

Latin Grammy Awards by year
Latin Grammy Awards
Grammy Awards
Annual Latin Grammy Awards
Annual Latin Grammy Awards